Fort Hood shooting may refer to:

 2009 Fort Hood shooting, which left thirteen people dead and 33 others injured
 2014 Fort Hood shootings, which left four people dead and 14 others injured